Stoke Park is a private sporting and leisure estate in Stoke Poges, Buckinghamshire. In 1908, it became the first country club in the UK. In 2013, it was awarded five red AA stars, the highest accolade for service and facilities for hotels, by The Automobile Association.

Stoke Park has served as the filming location for several major films, including James Bond's Goldfinger and Tomorrow Never Dies, Bridget Jones's Diary and Layer Cake. It also hosts the annual Boodles Tennis Championships as a warm-up to Wimbledon, a week prior to the Championships.

In June 2014, Stoke Park hosted an outdoor charity concert for SportsAid (patron: the Princess of Wales). Sir Elton John sang to 5,000 people and raised £825,000.

On August 2, 2021, the venue closed for refurbishment followed by the golf course on October 18, 2021. It is expected to reopen in summer 2023.

History

The estate

The Stoke Park estate's history dates back to the time of the Domesday Book. From 1066, the estate was inherited in a direct line of descent for 515 years until it had to be sold to the Crown in 1581 to pay the outstanding debts of Henry Hastings, 3rd Earl of Huntingdon, whose father Francis, the commander in chief of Henry VIII's army, had rebuilt the Manor House (part of which can still be seen today) in 1555.

John Penn (1760–1834), a soldier, scholar, and poet, is responsible for most of what can be seen at the estate today. He used a large proportion of the £130,000 the new United States government paid for his family's 26-million acre (110,000 km2) plot in Pennsylvania.

The mansion was designed by James Wyatt (architect to George III) who worked on the development of the mansion and surrounding monuments from 1790 to 1813. The parkland was the product of two geniuses of 18th-century landscape architecture, Lancelot "Capability" Brown and Humphry Repton, who designed in 1792 the landscape that can be seen today.

The estate is listed Grade II on the Register of Historic Parks and Gardens.

The club

The estate was used as a private residence until 1908 when Nick "Pa" Lane Jackson, founder of the Corinthian Sporting Club (Corinthian F.C.), purchased the estate and turned it into the UK's first country club. One of his initial objectives was to commission the famous amateur golfer and course architect Harry Colt (who also designed Pinevalley, Wentworth, Sunningdale, Muirfield and Royal Portrush) to design the golf course. The golf course, along with the tennis courts and the conversion of the mansion, were all completed within eight months.

In 1908, the club's first president was Prince Albert of Schleswig-Holstein and the first vice president was the Right Honourable Earl Howe. The committee also included Lord Chesterfield, Lord Kinnoull and Lord Decies.

In his 1910 book, The Golf Courses of the British Isles, Bernard Darwin wrote:

The mansion

The architecture of the United States Capitol, Washington D.C., which was built later, bears some resemblance to the mansion.

The pavilion
Opened in 2008, the pavilion building has a health and beauty spa, swimming pool, fitness studio, gym and bedrooms and suites on the first and second floors.

Golf

Stoke Park's 27 hole championship golf course was designed by Harry Colt in 1908. It was opened in July 1909 and received immediate acclaim:

Stoke Park is considered one of the "Top 100 Courses in England".

The Boodles tennis challenge

Stoke Park is the host of the annual Boodles Challenge, hosted the week prior to the Championships at Wimbledon. Playing on Stoke Park's grass courts, the world's best men have competed for the Boodles trophy since 2002, including Novak Djokovic, Andy Murray, Andy Roddick, Nikolay Davydenko and Juan Martín del Potro.

Movies at Stoke Park
Stoke Park has been the backdrop to many movies and TV programmes. Two James Bond films, Goldfinger (1964) and Tomorrow Never Dies (1997) have been filmed at the club. The epic duel between Bond (Sean Connery) and Goldfinger (Gert Frobe) led to Sean Connery's own "lifelong love affair with golf".

The "mini break" and rowing scenes which includes Hugh Grant falling into the lake when trying to get to Renée Zellweger watched by Colin Firth and Embeth Davidtz from Bridget Jones's Diary (2001) were filmed in the mansion, lakes and The Pennsylvania Suite.

In 2004, three movies were released featuring Stoke Park: Wimbledon, Bride & Prejudice, and Layer Cake. In Wimbledon, Paul Bettany featured on the grass tennis courts. Stoke Park featured heavily in Layer Cake, including the dramatic ending with Daniel Craig and Sienna Miller filmed on the mansion steps.

Guy Ritchie's RocknRolla (2008) also featured the grass tennis courts and the 21st Green.

Other features filmed at Stoke Park include, The Vice, The Professionals, Midsomer Murders, Dead of Night, and many advertisements.

References

External links

Companies based in Buckinghamshire
Gardens by Capability Brown
Gardens by Humphry Repton
Golf clubs and courses in Buckinghamshire
Grade I listed buildings in Buckinghamshire
Grade I listed houses
Grade II listed parks and gardens in Buckinghamshire
Resorts in England